The term EM3 may refer to :

 Exploration Mission-3 (EM-3), former name of Artemis 3, a planned mission for NASA's Artemis program
 Echo Meter EM3, a handheld active bat detector manufactured by US company Wildlife Acoustics
 e-M3, a test electric vehicle developed by Croatian company Rimac Automobili
 EM-3, a proposed experimental British assault rifle, a precursor of the EM-2 rifle 
 EM3, or Electrician's Mate 3rd Class, an enlisted rate in the US Navy and US Coast Guard
 EM3, a category for streaming pupils formerly used in education in Singapore